Maik Eckhardt (born 4 June 1970 in Bad Berleburg) is a German sport shooter who competed in the 1996 Summer Olympics, in the 2000 Summer Olympics, in the 2004 Summer Olympics, in the 2008 Summer Olympics, and in the 2012 Summer Olympics.

References

1970 births
Living people
German male sport shooters
ISSF rifle shooters
Olympic shooters of Germany
Shooters at the 1996 Summer Olympics
Shooters at the 2000 Summer Olympics
Shooters at the 2004 Summer Olympics
Shooters at the 2008 Summer Olympics
Shooters at the 2012 Summer Olympics
20th-century German people
21st-century German people